P.S. I Love Me (formerly titled Tattoos & Roses: The Rebellion Against My Pain) is the fourth studio album from American recording artist Lil' Mo, released on November 1, 2011, through HoneyChild Entertainment and the Bronx Bridge Entertainment independent label. The title is a reference to the 2007 film P.S. I Love You.

Background
In 2008, under a new label, Global Music Group, Lil' Mo began work a new album, formerly titled Tattoos & Roses: The Rebellion Against My Pain. Initially, the album was to include a double disc set; half of it being a live production. However, plans were scrapped and the album underwent a completely different recording process. The album's title was then revised to P.S. I Love Me with guest appearances from Tweet, Dawn Richard (of Danity Kane, Diddy-Dirty Money), PJ Morton and other performers Mo admired in the music industry. Initial contributors Missy Elliott, MC Lyte and Fabolous did not make the final cut due to undisclosed reasons. Prepping the release of the album, Lil' Mo hosted a radio show in Washington D.C. and insisted the album dives into "everything I have been through on my hiatus." On November 1, 2011, the project was released via HoneyChild Entertainment/Bronx Bridge Entertainment; distributed by Fontana Distribution.

Singles
The lead single "On the Floor" was released on June 11, 2011. It features American hype man Fatman Scoop. The music video was released on October 24, 2011, and was directed by Brandon Broady. The second single "I Love Me" was released on September 14, 2011. It features American soul/neo soul singer Tweet. The music video was released on March 15, 2012, and was directed by Dantrell "DanDaCameraman" Cohen. The third single "Take Me Away" was released on November 21, 2011. It features American hip hop recording artist Maino. The music video was released on June 13, 2012, and was directed by Rashad Hassan.

Track listing

Personnel
Credits are taken from the album's liner notes.

Managerial
 Management – Adam Arnwine, Leon Cosby III, Bella Wilkinson, Neville Williams, Jermaine Wilson

Performance credits

 Vocals – Lil' Mo

 Background vocals – Mumen "Mookie" Ngenge, Dawn Richard, Britney Spencer

Visuals and imagery
 Photographer – Michael Antonio Hunter
 Graphic design – Thi-Lai Simpson

Instruments

 Guitar – Terrell "Henny" McClain

 Keyboards – Josh "JD" Thomas

Technical and production

Composers – Daniel Bryant, James Bryant, Phillip Bryant, Jermaine Coleman, Isaac Freeman, Donovan Green, Lil' Mo, Paul S. Morton Jr., Dawn Richard, Brandon A. Smith
Executive producers – Phillip J. Bryant, Lil' Mo

Mastering – Glenn Schick
Production – B-Boys, Daniel Bryant, Phillip J. Bryant
Vocal production – Britney Spencer

References

External links
 

2011 albums
Lil' Mo albums